Florian Trinks (born 11 March 1992) is a German former professional footballer who played as an attacking midfielder.

Club career

Greuther Fürth
Trinks scored his first Bundesliga goal on the last matchday of the season in Greuther Fürth's 3–1 defeat against FC Augsburg.

After the referee awarded a goal in a match against SV Sandhausen on 8 December 2013, Trinks admitted he had handled the ball before it crossed the line, and the "goal" was disallowed. He was later presented with a fair-play medal in recognition of his sportsmanship.

Ferencváros
After only two appearances in the first half of the 2015–16 season for Greuther Fürth, Trinks signed as a free agent with Hungarian team Ferencvárosi TC on 21 January 2016.

Chemnitzer FC
In June 2017, Trinks joined 3. Liga club Chemnitzer FC on a two-year deal. A year later, he was released by the club.

1. FC Schweinfurt 05
In August 2018, Trinks signed with 1. FC Schweinfurt 05 in tier-four Regionalliga Bayern.

Retirement
Trinks retired in 2019 aged 27, after sustaining a heavy injury to his ankle.

International career
Alongside with Mario Götze and Marc-André ter Stegen, Trinks represented Germany at the 2009 UEFA European Under-17 Football Championship, in which the team won the title after his decisive free-kick goal in the overtime period of the final.

Personal life
Following his retirement from playing, Trinks studied to become a primary school teacher. As of June 2021, he lives near Nürnberg and has two children.

Honours
Ferencváros
 Hungarian National Championship: 2015–16
 Hungarian Cup: 2015–16, 2016–17

Germany U17
 UEFA European Under-17 Championship: 2009

Individual
 Fair-Play Medal Deutsche Olympische Gesellschaft: 2014
 Goal of the Month (Germany): May 2009

References

External links
 
 
 

1992 births
Living people
German expatriate sportspeople in Hungary
Association football midfielders
German footballers
Germany youth international footballers
German expatriate footballers
Expatriate footballers in Hungary
Bundesliga players
2. Bundesliga players
3. Liga players
Nemzeti Bajnokság I players
1. FC Gera 03 players
FC Carl Zeiss Jena players
SV Werder Bremen II players
SV Werder Bremen players
SpVgg Greuther Fürth players
Chemnitzer FC players
Ferencvárosi TC footballers
1. FC Schweinfurt 05 players
Sportspeople from Gera
Footballers from Thuringia